Tai-pop may refer to:
Tai Lüe popular music 
Taiwanese pop music in Taiwan